is a 2007 anime short film by Kōji Yamamura.

The film is a direct interpretation of Franz Kafka's short story "A Country Doctor", voiced by kyōgen actors of the Shigeyama house.

The film has won several awards, including the 2008 Ōfuji Noburō Award from the Mainichi Film Concours and the 2007 Grand Prize at the Ottawa International Animation Festival. It was also included in the Animation Show of Shows in 2008.

Plot 
The story involves a country doctor who describes his urgent call to look after a young patient.

More and more, the doctor gets involved in surreal experiences as he is transported to his patient by seemingly "unearthly horses" in a blink of an eye. While treating the patient, he fails to find the fatal wound which results in humiliation by the villagers and an endless return trip, losing everything.

It tells the story of the continuous pressure on doctors, and the never-ending impossible expectations laying on their shoulders.

References

External links 
  
 
 

2000s animated short films
2007 anime films
Anime short films
Films based on short fiction
Films based on works by Franz Kafka
Medical-themed films
Shochiku films
Films directed by Kōji Yamamura